In mathematics, the Banach fixed-point theorem (also known as the contraction mapping theorem or contractive mapping theorem) is an important tool in the theory of metric spaces; it guarantees the existence and uniqueness of fixed points of certain self-maps of metric spaces, and provides a constructive method to find those fixed points. It can be understood as an abstract formulation of Picard's method of successive approximations. The theorem is named after Stefan Banach (1892–1945) who first stated it in 1922.

Statement
Definition. Let  be a complete metric space. Then a map  is called a contraction mapping on X if there exists  such that

for all 

Banach Fixed Point Theorem. Let  be a non-empty complete metric space with a contraction mapping  Then T admits a unique fixed-point  in X (i.e. ).

Remark 1. The following inequalities are equivalent and describe the speed of convergence:

Remark 2.  for all  is in general not enough to ensure the existence of a fixed point, as is shown by the map

which lacks a fixed point.

Remark 3. When using the theorem in practice, the most difficult part is typically to define  properly so that

Proof

Let  be arbitrary and define a sequence  by setting xn = T(xn−1). We first note that for all  we have the inequality

This follows by induction on n, using the fact that T is a contraction mapping. Then we can show that  is a Cauchy sequence. In particular, let  such that m > n:

 

Let ε > 0 be arbitrary. Since q ∈ [0, 1), we can find a large  so that

Therefore, by choosing m and n greater than N we may write:

This proves that the sequence  is Cauchy. By completeness of (X,d), the sequence has a limit  Furthermore,  must be a fixed point of T:

As a contraction mapping, T is continuous, so bringing the limit inside T was justified. Lastly, T cannot have more than one fixed point in (X,d), since any pair of distinct fixed points p1 and p2 would contradict the contraction of T:

Applications
A standard application is the proof of the Picard–Lindelöf theorem about the existence and uniqueness of solutions to certain ordinary differential equations. The sought solution of the differential equation is expressed as a fixed point of a suitable integral operator which changes continuous functions into continuous functions. The Banach fixed-point theorem is then used to show that this integral operator has a unique fixed point.
One consequence of the Banach fixed-point theorem is that small Lipschitz perturbations of the identity are bi-lipschitz homeomorphisms. Let Ω be an open set of a Banach space E; let I : Ω → E denote the identity (inclusion) map and let g : Ω → E be a Lipschitz map of constant k < 1. Then 
Ω′ := (I+g)(Ω) is an open subset of E: precisely, for any x in Ω such that B(x, r) ⊂ Ω one has B((I+g)(x), r(1−k)) ⊂ Ω′; 
I+g : Ω → Ω′ is a bi-lipschitz homeomorphism; 
precisely, (I+g)−1 is still of the form I + h : Ω → Ω′ with h a Lipschitz map of constant k/(1−k). A direct consequence  of this result yields the proof of the inverse function theorem.
It can be used to give sufficient conditions under which Newton's method of successive approximations is guaranteed to work, and similarly for Chebyshev's third order method.
It can be used to prove existence and uniqueness of solutions to integral equations.
It can be used to give a proof to the Nash embedding theorem.
It can be used to prove existence and uniqueness of solutions to value iteration, policy iteration, and policy evaluation of reinforcement learning.
It can be used to prove existence and uniqueness of an equilibrium in Cournot competition, and other dynamic economic models.

Converses
Several converses of the Banach contraction principle exist. The following is due to Czesław Bessaga, from 1959:

Let f : X → X be a map of an abstract set such that each iterate fn has a unique fixed point. Let  then there exists a complete metric on X such that f is contractive, and q is the contraction constant.

Indeed, very weak assumptions suffice to obtain such a kind of converse. For example if  is a map on a T1 topological space with a unique fixed point a, such that for each  we have fn(x) → a, then there already exists a metric on X with respect to which f satisfies the conditions of the Banach contraction principle with contraction constant 1/2. In this case the metric is in fact an ultrametric.

Generalizations
There are a number of generalizations (some of which are immediate corollaries).

Let T : X → X be a map on a complete non-empty metric space. Then, for example, some generalizations of the Banach fixed-point theorem are:
Assume that some iterate Tn of T is a contraction. Then T has a unique fixed point.
Assume that for each n, there exist cn such that d(Tn(x), Tn(y)) ≤ cnd(x, y) for all x and y, and that

Then T has a unique fixed point.
In applications, the existence and uniqueness of a fixed point often can be shown directly with the standard Banach fixed point theorem, by a suitable choice of the metric that makes the map T a contraction. Indeed, the above result by Bessaga strongly suggests to look for such a metric. See also the article on fixed point theorems in infinite-dimensional spaces for generalizations.

A different class of generalizations arise from suitable generalizations of the notion of metric space, e.g. by weakening the defining axioms for the notion of metric. Some of these have applications, e.g., in the theory of programming semantics in theoretical computer science.

See also

 Brouwer fixed-point theorem
 Caristi fixed-point theorem
 Contraction mapping
 Fichera's existence principle
 Fixed-point iteration
 Fixed-point theorems
 Infinite compositions of analytic functions
 Kantorovich theorem

Notes

References

 See chapter 7.

Articles containing proofs
Fixed-point theorems
Metric geometry
Topology